Louis Charles, Duke of Schleswig-Holstein-Sonderburg-Franzhagen (4 June 1684 – 11 October 1707) was a German nobleman and ruler from the House of Schleswig-Holstein-Sonderburg, cadet line of the House of Oldenburg.

Early life
He was the second son of Duke Christian Adolph of Schleswig-Holstein-Sonderburg-Franzhagen and his wife, Princess Eleonora Charlotte of Saxe-Lauenburg.

Succession
In 1707, he succeeded his elder brother Leopold Christian as Duke of Schleswig-Holstein-Sonderburg-Franzhagen.  However, he died later that year.

Marriage and children
In 1705, he was married to Anna Barbara Dorothea von Winterfeld (1670-1739) in Ottensen, near Hamburg. She was daughter of Barthold Dietrich von Winterfeld and Sophie Margarete von Warnstedt. Although she belonged to lower nobility, their marriage was recognized as equal and their children thus had succession rights and were able to inherit the Duchy. They had two children together:

 Eleonore Charlotte (2 September 1706 – 9 February 1708)
 Christian Adolph II (16 September 1707 – 26 March 1709)

His son Christian succeeded as Christian II Adolph, Duke of Schleswig-Holstein-Sonderburg-Franzhagen. As he was still a minor, he reigned under the regency. With his death in 1709, the Schleswig-Holstein-Sonderburg-Franzhagen line died out.

References

Bibliography 
 

House of Oldenburg in Schleswig-Holstein
1684 births
1707 deaths
Dukes of Germany
17th-century German people